Deeping St James is a large village in the South Kesteven district of Lincolnshire, England. The population of the civil parish (including Frognall) was reported as 7,051 at the 2011 census.

History

Based around a now lost 12th-century Benedictine Priory, destroyed during the Dissolution of the Monasteries, the Grade I listed Anglican church of St James is the largest church in The Deepings. It is a mixture of Norman, Early English and Perpendicular styles, with a tower and spire added in 1717. The stones from the priory were used to build various 17th-century buildings in the area.

The village also has an 18th-century village lock-up, constructed on the site and with the materials from a 15th-century wayside cross.

In the 17th century the manor was associated with the Wymondsold family of Welbeck Place, Putney, Surrey and East Lockinge, Berks.

St James Deeping railway station, built by the Great Northern Railway Company in 1848, was closed in 1964.

Although the separate cut for the Stamford Canal did not start until upstream of Market Deeping, Briggin's lock (or the Deeping High lock) was an important part of the Welland Navigation, and is still in place but is not navigable.

Geography
With a population of 6,923 in 2,837 households, it is the largest of The Deepings parishes. It falls within the drainage basin of the Welland and Deepings Internal Drainage Board.

Community
The parish church of St James is part of the Elloe West Deanery of the Diocese of Lincoln. The 2013 incumbent is The Reverend Sonia Marshall. There is also the Catholic church of Our Lady and St Guthlac, and a Methodist and two Baptist chapels. With St Guthlac's church in Market Deeping, these comprise the Churches Together in Deeping group.

The Deepings School, the main secondary school for the Deepings area, is located next to the Deeping St James Leisure Centre.

The village has three public houses, Chinese restaurants and takeaways, a pizza restaurant, garage, home care provider, bakery/tea room, a garden railway specialist, and three computer systems companies.

Resident at Deeping St James is three-time BDO World Champion and three-time World Masters darts champion Martin Adams. In 2015 he was granted the freedom of Deeping St James by the local parish council.

Sport
A short lived greyhound racing track was opened at the rear of Bundle Farm on 13 June 1931. The racing was independent (not affiliated to the sports governing body the National Greyhound Racing Club) and was known as a flapping track, which was the nickname given to independent tracks. Racing was every Tuesday and Saturday.

Gallery

References

External links

 Deeping St James Parish Council. Retrieved 8 July 2013 
 Deepings.com. Retrieved 8 July 2013
 "Deepings", Churches Together in Spalding & District. Retrieved 8 July 2013
 Deeping "St James", Homepages.which.net. Retrieved 8 July 2013

Villages in Lincolnshire
The Deepings
Civil parishes in Lincolnshire